Van Keulen is a Dutch toponymic surname meaning "from Cologne". Van Ceulen is an archaic spelling variant. People with this name include:

Ada van Keulen (1920–2010), Dutch Resistance member
 (born 1943), Dutch composer, conductor and clarinetist
Isabelle van Keulen (born 1966), Dutch violinist
Johannes van Keulen (1654–1715), Dutch cartographer
Joannes van Keulen (died 1572), Dominican priest and martyr (St. John of Cologne)
Julie Van Keulen (born 1959), Australian Paralympic athlete
Machiel van Keulen (born 1984), Dutch football midfielder
Mensje van Keulen (born 1946), Dutch novelist (pseudonym of Mensje van der Steen)
Susan van Keulen (born 1961), American judge

See also
Van Keulenfjorden, Spitsbergen fjord named in 1710 after the cartographer , son of Johannes van Keulen
Atje Keulen-Deelstra (1938–2013), Dutch speed skater
Marino Keulen (born 1963), Belgian politician

References

Dutch-language surnames
Toponymic surnames